Pomasia galastis is a moth in the family Geometridae. It is found in the north-eastern Himalayas and on Borneo. The habitat consists of forests, including secondary forests, from lowland areas to altitudes of about 1,700 meters.

References

Moths described in 1897
Eupitheciini